The Breakers '83 was a various artists "hits" collection album released in Australia in 1983 on the Polygram record Label. The album spent 2 weeks at the top of the Australian album charts in 1983.

Track listing

Side 1
"Beat It" by Michael Jackson
"Der Kommissar" by After the Fire
"I'm Still Standing" by Elton John
"Buffalo Gals" by Malcolm McLaren
"Wham Rap" by Wham!
"Little Red Corvette" by Prince
"Black and White" by INXS
"Overkill" by Men at Work
"Street Cafe" by Icehouse

Side 2
"Solitaire" by Laura Branigan
"The Walls Came Down" by The Call
"Stand Back" by Stevie Nicks
"Let's Go to Bed" by The Cure
"Mad World" by Tears for Fears
"Speak Like a Child" by The Style Council
"Candy Girl" by New Edition
"It's Raining Men" by The Weather Girls
"Total Eclipse of the Heart" by Bonnie Tyler

Charts

References

1983 compilation albums
Pop compilation albums
Rock compilation albums